Norbert Rózsa (born 9 February 1972) is a former breaststroker from Hungary, who competed at three consecutive Olympics, beginning with the 1992 Summer Olympics in Barcelona. He won two silver medals, in the 100 m and 200 m breaststroke, and became Olympic champion in Atlanta, Georgia in the 200 m breaststroke.

He was elected Hungarian Sportsman of the Year in 1994 for winning two gold medals at that year's World Aquatics Championships.

After retirement from sport he was battling depression. In May 2007, he was hospitalized after a suicide attempt. Then he recovered from depression in about a year time  and later he became interested in working as a graphic designer.

Awards
 Masterly youth athlete: 1989
 OSH Victory medal for the World Champion (1991)
  Cross of Merit of the Republic of Hungary – Golden Cross (1992)
 OTSH Victory medal for the World Champion (1994)
 Hungarian swimmer of the Year (3): 1994, 1996, 1998
 Hungarian Sportsman of the Year (1) - votes of sports journalists: 1994
  Order of Merit of the Republic of Hungary – Officer's Cross (1996)
 Member of International Swimming Hall of Fame (2005)
 Immortal of Hungarian swimming (2014)

See also
 List of members of the International Swimming Hall of Fame

References

External links
 Profile at kataca.hu 
 

1972 births
Living people
Hungarian male swimmers
Olympic swimmers of Hungary
Swimmers at the 1992 Summer Olympics
Swimmers at the 1996 Summer Olympics
Swimmers at the 2000 Summer Olympics
Male breaststroke swimmers
Olympic gold medalists for Hungary
Olympic silver medalists for Hungary
World record setters in swimming
World Aquatics Championships medalists in swimming
European Aquatics Championships medalists in swimming
European champions for Hungary
Medalists at the 1996 Summer Olympics
Medalists at the 1992 Summer Olympics
Olympic gold medalists in swimming
Olympic silver medalists in swimming